McLeod Lake is an unincorporated community located on Highway 97 in northern British Columbia, Canada,  north of Prince George. It is notable for being the first continuously inhabited European settlement established west of the Rocky Mountains in present-day Canada.

History 
Originally named Trout Lake Fort, it was founded by the explorer and North West Company trader Simon Fraser in 1805 and was for a while known as La Malice Fort, after an employee left in charge during Fraser's absence. It became known soon after as Fort McLeod during the tenure of Archibald Norman McLeod, who was in charge of the post for many years.   The site of the fort was designated a National Historic Site of Canada in 1953.

McLeod Lake Indian Reserve No. 1, which is adjacent to the non-native community, has a population of around 87, the main residents being an Athabascan Sekani people known as "Tse'Khene" (the people of the rock, in reference to the Rocky Mountains). Having signed Treaty 8 in the year 2000, the natives of the community are trying to direct themselves towards self-government and employment stability.

A point in the marshes on its southern shore of nearby Summit Lake marks the low point of the divide between the drainages of the Fraser and Peace Rivers, As such it is significant as the prominence col between all points south in the Rockies and beyond and their "parent" summits in northern BC and Alaska.

See also
Mackenzie, British Columbia

References

Bibliography
BCGNIS listing "Fort McLeod (fort)" - Rescinded
BC Geographical Names listing "McLeod Lake (Community)"
BC Geographical Names listing "Fort McLeod Historic Park"

External links
Carp Lake Provincial Park

Unincorporated settlements in British Columbia
Populated places in the Regional District of Fraser-Fort George
Fur trade
Hudson's Bay Company forts
North West Company
Heritage sites in British Columbia
National Historic Sites in British Columbia
Hudson's Bay Company trading posts